Mubarak Abdullahi El-Fadil El-Mahdi  (born Khartoum, Sudan, 1950, commonly known as Mubarak El-Fadil) is an economist and prominent Sudanese politician. He was appointed to several political and executive positions as part of the National Umma Party Sudan in the democratic Government of Sudan during the period 1986-1989.

Politics
In 2017, Al-Mahdi indicated he would not object to normal diplomatic relations between Sudan and Israel. He was also critical of Palestine's role in the Israeli–Palestinian conflict.

References

1950 births
Living people
People from Khartoum
National Umma Party politicians
Government ministers of Sudan